General Conference can refer to:

United Nations
General Conference (United Nations), the recurring meetings of Member States for the specialized agencies of the United Nations such as the International Atomic Energy Agency and UNESCO.

Christianity
General conference (Latter Day Saints), a meeting open to all members of a particular Latter Day Saint denomination.
General Conference (LDS Church), a semi-annual world conference of The Church of Jesus Christ of Latter-day Saints held in April and October. 
General Conference Mennonite Church, an association of Mennonite congregations based in North America from 1860 to 2002
General Conference (Methodism), the top legislative body in many Methodist denominations
General Conference of Seventh-day Adventists, the world governing body of the Seventh-day Adventist Church
1888 Minneapolis General Conference (Adventist), a particularly important meeting of the General Conference of Seventh-day Adventists in 1888

See also
 Baptist General Conference
 Friends General Conference
 SDARM General Conference, the governing authority for the Seventh Day Adventist Reform Movement denomination